Jamaica at the Pan American Games.

At the most recent games in 2019, Jamaica won a record 19 medals.

Medal count

References

External links
JOA - Jamaica Olympic Association Official site.